Matt Nolan is an English drummer and artist.

Matthew Nolan or Matt Nolan may refer to:

 Matt Nolan, a contestant on Grease: You're the One That I Want!
 Matthew Nolan (musician, born 1973), co-founder of 3epkano
 Matthew Nolan (musician, born 1999), member of Since September
 Matthew J.V. Nolan or Vincent Nolan, an Irish police officer